Justice is a given name. Notable people with the name include:

 Justice Samuel Adjei, Ghanaian politician
 Justice Akrofi (born 1942), Ghanaian Anglican Bishop
 Justice Joe Appiah (born 1959), Ghanaian politician
 Justice M. Chambers (1908–1982), U.S. Marine officer
 Justice Christopher (born 1981), Nigerian footballer
 Justice Cunningham (born 1991), American football player
 Justice Dipeba (born 1973),  Botswana sprinter
 Justice John Erhenede (born 1986), Nigerian footballer 
 Justice Esono (born 1986),  Equatoguinean footballer
 Justice Hansen (American football), American football player
 Justice Hill (born 1997), American football player
 Justice Howard (born 1960), American photographer
 Justice Leak (born 1979), American actor
 Justice Majabvi (born 1984, Zimbabwean footballer
 Justice Morgan (footballer) (born 1991), Nigerian footballer 
 Justice Pain (1978–2020), American professional wrestler
 Justice Smith (born 1995), American actor
 Justise Winslow (born 1996), American professional basketball player
 Justice Yeldham (born 1972), Australian musician

See also
Justus (given name)